Chalers is a surname. Notable people with the surname include:

John Chalers (1361–1388), English politician
Thomas Chalers (1383–1443), English politician